The House of Guttenberg is a prominent Franconian noble family. It traces its origins back to 1149 with a Gundeloh von Blassenberg (Plassenberg), though the first mention in a document is dated 1158. The name Guttenberg is derived from Guttenberg in present-day Bavaria, and it was adopted by a Heinrich von Blassenberg around 1310.

History 
The Plassenberg family members were ministeriales of the Counts of Andechs (later the Dukes of Andechs-Meranien) and used as their seat the Plassenburg of Kulmbach. The castle of Guttenberg remains the main seat of the family.

The family currently consists of two branches: the elder branch, von und zu Guttenberg, and the younger Steinhausen branch. In 1700, the family rose from the rank of Reichsritter (Imperial Knight) to Reichsfreiherr (Baron of the Holy Roman Empire).

After the Holy Roman Empire dissolved, they were given the rank of Freiherr (Baron) of Bavaria (1814 and 1817). According to historian Werner Wagenhöfer, the Guttenberg family is the most researched family of the low nobility in Franconia, along with the Seckendorff and Bibra families.

Prominent members 

 Johann Gottfried von Guttenberg, Prince-Bishop of Würzburg (1684–1698)
 Emil Freiherr von Guttenberg (1841–1941), Austrian politician
 Elisabeth Johanna Freifrau von und zu Guttenberg (1900–1998), chair of the Arbeitsgemeinschaft Katholischer Frauen Bayerns
 Karl Ludwig Freiherr von und zu Guttenberg (1902–1945), anti-Nazi activist and Catholic monarchist
 Karl Theodor Freiherr von und zu Guttenberg (1921–1972), German CSU politician
 Enoch zu Guttenberg (1946–2018), conductor
 Karl-Theodor Freiherr von und zu Guttenberg (born 1971), German CSU politician, former Federal Minister of Commerce and Minister of Defense in the first and second Merkel Cabinets
 Philipp Anton Christoph Freiherr von Guttenberg, Domherr of Würzburg

Localities with the Guttenberg coat-of-arms

References 
 Genealogisches Handbuch des in Bayern immatrikulierten Adels, Band XXV, 2004, pages 420–430.

 
Guttenberg
Barons of the Holy Roman Empire